Nompumelelo Hospital is a Provincial government funded hospital for the Ngqushwa Local Municipality area in Peddie, Eastern Cape in South Africa.

The hospital departments include Emergency department, Paediatric ward, Maternity ward, Obstetrics, Gynaecology Services, Out Patients Department, Surgical Services, Medical Services, Operating Theatre & CSSD Services, Pharmacy, Anti-Retroviral (ARV) treatment for HIV/AIDS, Post Trauma Counseling Services, Physiotherapy, Occupational Services, Laboratory Services, X-ray Services, Laundry Services and Kitchen Services.

References 
 Nompumelelo Hospital

Hospitals in the Eastern Cape
Amathole District Municipality